Saskia Vester (born 24 July 1959) is a German actress and author.

Life 
Vester was born in Saarbrücken, the daughter of the biochemist and environmentalist Frederic Vester and the sister of actress .

At the same time, and since 2000 exclusively, she worked in numerous theatrical and TV films as well as in TV series. In 1985, Vester published her own novel, Pols Reise.

Vester lives with her husband, television producer Robbie Flörke, and their two children in Munich.

Filmography (selection) 

 1986: Der Schwammerlkönig
 1986: Zwei auf der Straße
 1987: Hans im Glück
 1987: Franz Xaver Brunnmayr – Der sechzigste Geburtstag (TV series)
 1988: Doppelter Einsatz
 1988: Alle meine Töchter
 1988: 
 1989: Filser Briefe
 1990: Tatort – Wer zweimal stirbt
 1990: Das Geheimnis der falschen Spuren
 1991: Tatort – 
 1991: Ein Fall für zwei – Eiskalt
 1991: Wie Pech und Schwefel
 1991: Die Anhalterin
 1991: Abgetrieben
 1993: Janas Freiheit
 1993: Rußige Zeiten (TV series)
 1993: Im Schatten der Gipfel
 1995: Tatort – Tod eines Auktionators
 1995: Ausweglos
 1995: Eldorado
 1996: Der Fahrradfahrer
 1996: Rendezvous des Todes
 1997: Winterschläfer
 1997: Zum sterben schön
 1997: Die Schule
 1998: 
 1998: Supersingle
 1998: Gestern ist nie vorbei
 1998: Zwei allein
 1998: Die Verbrechen des Professor Capellari
 1998: Der Bulle von Tölz (The Mistletoe Murder)
 1998–2001: Anwalt Abel (TV series, 7 episodes)
 1999: Tatort – Kinder der Gewalt
 1999: Vertrauen ist alles
 1999: The Coq Is Dead
 1999: Gangster
 1999: Eine schräge Familie
 2000: Tatort – 
 2000: Love Trip
 2000: Ich beiß zurück
 2001: 
 2001:  – Amoklauf
 2001: Mein Vater und andere Betrüger
 2001: Die Westentaschenvenus
 2002: Verdammt verliebt (TV series, 26 episodes)
 2002: Geht nicht gibt’s nicht
 2002: Der Glücksbote
 2002: Mann gesucht, Liebe gefunden
 2002: Weihnachten im September
 2002: Mutter auf der Palme
 2003: Die Rosenheim-Cops – Blattschuss
 2003: Die Ärztin
 2003: Der Bulle von Tölz (Painting with Vincent)
 2003: Ein großes Mädchen wie du (Une grande fille comme toi)
 2004: Ein Gauner Gottes
 2004: Guys and Balls
 2004: Im Zweifel für die Liebe
 2004: K3 – Kripo Hamburg – Porzellan
 2004: Mein Weg zu dir heißt Liebe
 2005: Das Gespenst von Canterville
 2005–2010: Die Landärztin
 2005: Heirate meine Frau
 2005: 
 2005: Liebe wie am ersten Tag
 2005: Das Glück klopft an die Tür (alternative title: Rein ins Leben)
 2006: Donna Leon – Das Gesetz der Lagune
 2007–2009: KDD – Kriminaldauerdienst
 2006: Grave Decisions
 2006: Im Namen der Braut
 2006: Das Glück klopt an die Tür
 2007: Die Schnüfflerin – Peggy kann’s nicht lassen
 2008: Unser Mann im Süden – Ausgetrickst
 2008–2012: Der Schwarzwaldhof (6 episodes)
 2008: Don Quichote – Gib niemals auf!
 2008: Wilsberg – Das Jubiläum
 2009: 
 2009: Bleib bei mir
 2009: Die göttliche Sophie
 2009: All You Need Is Love – Meine Schwiegertochter ist ein Mann
 2010: Ayla
 2010: Hochzeitsreise zu viert
 2010: Das Haus ihres Vaters
 2011: Almanya: Welcome to Germany
 2011: Für kein Geld der Welt
 2011: 
 2011: Nach der Hochzeit bin ich weg!
 2011: Polizeiruf 110: Denn sie wissen nicht, was sie tun
 2012: Balthasar Berg – Sylt sehen und sterben
 2012: Emilie Richards – Spuren der Vergangenheit
 2012: Heiraten ist auch keine Lösung
 2012: Herbstkind
 2012: Jeder Tag zählt
 2012: Mord in bester Gesellschaft – Der Tod der Sünde
 2013: Utta Danella: Wer küsst den Doc?
 2013: Viva la libertà
 2014: Kreuzfahrt ins Glück –  Hochzeitsreise nach Barcelona
 2014: Wealthy Corpses: A Crime Story from Starnberg
 2014: Die Dienstagsfrauen – Sieben Tage ohne
 2014: Die Fremde und das Dorf
 2014: Schluss! Aus! Amen!
 2015: Die Dienstagsfrauen – Zwischen Kraut und Rüben
 2015: Kubanisch für Fortgeschrittene
 2015: Weihnachts-Männer
 2016: Beat Beat Heart
 2016: In aller Freundschaft – Spott und Ruhm
 2016: Marie fängt Feuer
 2017: Frühling Schritt ins Licht

Radio 
 2012: Der Stalker – ARD Radio-Tatort (Bayerischer Rundfunk) – Regie: Ulrich Lampen

Awards 
 2007: Bavarian TV Awards for the role of Kristin Bender in KDD – Kriminaldauerdienst

Literature 
Pols Reise (1985)

References

External links 
 
 Saskia Vester at prisma.de
 Saskia Vester at die-agenten.de

1959 births
Living people
People from Saarbrücken
German film actresses
German stage actresses